The Ministry of Home Affairs (Sinhala: ස්වදේශ කටයුතු අමාත්‍යාංශය Swadēsha Katayuthu Amathyanshaya; Tamil: உள்நாட்டலுவல்கள் அமைச்சு) is a cabinet ministry of the Government of Sri Lanka responsible for public administration.

The Minister of Home Affairs is one of the most senior ministers in the government and ranks third in the ministerial ranking. The ministry is responsible for formulating and implementing national policy on home affairs and other subjects which come under its purview. The ministry manages the country's administrative service, including District and Divisional Secretariats as well as the Grama Niladhari (village officers) network under the oversight of the latter.

The current Minister of Home Affairs is Prime Minister Dinesh Gunawardena.

Ministers

Secretaries

References

External links
 

Home Affairs
 
Sri Lanka
Home Affairs
Members of the Board of Ministers of Ceylon